Idhu Enna Maayam is a 2015 Indian Tamil-language romantic comedy film written and directed by A. L. Vijay and produced by R. Sarathkumar, Raadhika and Listin Stephen under the production banner of Magic Frames. The film stars Vikram Prabhu and Keerthy Suresh, while Kavya Shetty essays a supporting role. Suresh made her Tamil debut with this film. Navdeep has a cameo appearance in this film. G. V. Prakash Kumar composes the film's music. Production began for the film in August 2014 and released in July 2015 and it was reported as inspired by Cyrano Agency.

Plot
Arun is a struggling theater artist. With the help of his friends, who are also struggling theater artists, he starts a website called UMT which helps men struggling in love successfully unite with the woman of their dreams with the help of theatrics. One day, UMT gets a rich client in the form of Santhosh, the owner of a real estate company. Santhosh is in love with a singer named Maya and offers 1,00,00,000 if Arun and his friends can help him win Maya's heart. Arun has second thoughts over the offer because Maya is his ex-girlfriend. They had broken up due to a serious misunderstanding between them. Though he still has feelings for Maya, he reluctantly agrees to help Santhosh. However, he foils all the plans to bring Santhosh and Maya together. A frustrated Santhosh then directly proposes to Maya, but she rejects him as she has still not forgotten Arun. In the end, it is revealed that Santhosh and Arun's friends knew about Arun's love for Maya, and with her help, they deliberately made all the plans to unite Santhosh and Maya fail so that Arun and Maya can get back together. Arun realizes his mistake and declares his love for Maya, thus rekindling their romance.

Cast

 Vikram Prabhu as Arun
 Keerthy Suresh as Maya
 Kavya Shetty as Pallavi
 Nassar as Arun's father
 Ambika as Arun's mother
 RJ Balaji as Arun's friend
 Parvathi T as Maya's mother
 Jeeva Ravi as Maya's father
 Charle as RJ Balaji's father
 Luthfudeen Baashaa as Venky
 Lollu Sabha Jeeva as Shaji
 Balaji Venugopal as Bharath
 Aditi Ravi as Nithya
 Manobala
 RJ Ajai as Karthik
 Vishal Verma as Maya's friend
 Abishek Joseph George as Maya's friend
 Pawan Alex
 Atul
 Kumaran Thangarajan
 Milton Raju
 Sudakshina Sivakumar
 Dixitha Kothari
 Vidhya
 Ammu Abhirami
 Gayathri Raghuram as Dance choreographer
 Navdeep as Santhosh (Extended cameo appearance)

Production
The collaboration between the producers, director A. L. Vijay and Vikram Prabhu was first revealed in July 2014, when the director noted he had finished writing the script for a romantic film to be shot in Chennai. In August 2014, Malayali actress Keerthi Suresh was brought in to play the female lead role, thus making her debut in Tamil films. Kavya Shetty, who had previously featured in Kannada films, also joined the cast later that month and participated in a workshop to get into her character of a college girl in the flashback sequences. The shoot subsequently began in Kochi and progressed across Kerala and Tamil Nadu in August 2014.

The film progressed without a title until December 2014, when director Vijay revealed that the film would be titled as Idu Enna Maayam and a first look poster was released.

Soundtrack

The music is composed by G. V. Prakash Kumar and all lyrics are by Na. Muthukumar except for first track by MC Vickey and declared a Hit by the Youngsters.

Release
The satellite rights of the film were sold to Sun TV.

References

External links
 

2010s Tamil-language films
2015 films
Films scored by G. V. Prakash Kumar
Films directed by A. L. Vijay
Films shot in Kochi
Films set in Kerala
Indian romantic comedy films
Films shot in Chennai
Films set in Chennai
Films about theatre
Indian remakes of South Korean films
2015 romantic comedy films